The Upper Palatinate Tower is an observation tower on the  high Platte mountain, the highest peak in the Steinwald and in Northern Upper Palatinate in southern Germany.

The first solid observation tower was built in 1971/72 by the Steinwald Nature Park Authority from Steinwald spruce trees. Due to dilapidation it had to be demolished on 1 April 1998. 
The engineer, Ferdinand Lehner, from Tirschenreuth was then given the contract to design and build a new tower.

On 10 September 2000 the new observation tower was opened. The contract was let by the town of Erbendorf. The total cost of construction came to about DM 400,000 and was supported by grants from the European Union, the Free State of Bavaria, the district of Tirschenreuth and the surrounding towns and villages. From the observation platform there are views of the  Fichtelgebirge, the Egerland, the Stiftland and over the Upper Palatine Forest.

External links 
Photos from the tower

Observation towers in Bavaria
Buildings and structures in Bavaria
Towers completed in 2000